Pharneuptychia is a genus of satyrid butterflies found in the Neotropical realm.

Species
Listed alphabetically:
Pharneuptychia boliviana (Hayward, 1957)
Pharneuptychia innocentia (C. & R. Felder, 1867)
Pharneuptychia phares (Godart, [1824])
Pharneuptychia pharnabazos (Bryk, 1953)
Pharneuptychia pharnaces (Weymer, 1911)
Pharneuptychia romanina (Bryk, 1953)

References

Euptychiina
Butterfly genera
Taxa named by Walter Forster (entomologist)